Lélio is a stock character of the commedia dell'arte.

Lélio represents the happy innamorati, loved by the woman he loves (often Isabella), always friendly, gay, cheerful, with a hint of comic.

Several actors played the role in Paris, particularly Luigi Riccoboni who gained great successes with the part due to his talent, grace, elegance and happy countenance, as well as his son Antoine-François Riccoboni, called "Lélio fils".

Molière introduced  the figure of Lélio in two of his comedies, l'Étourdi and The Imaginary Cuckold. Marivaux used it in his  Surprise de l'amour and his Prince travesti.

Being of aristocratic rank, his outfit is highly sought as a court dress.

See also 
 Pantalone
 Vecchio

Sources 
 Arthur Pougin, Dictionnaire historique et pittoresque du théâtre et des arts qui s’y rattachent, Paris, Firmin-Didot, 1885, (p.468-9).

Theatre in Italy
Commedia dell'arte male characters